FIDF may refer to:

 Falkland Islands Defence Force, the local volunteer defence unit in the Falkland Islands
 Friends of the Israel Defense Forces, an American charity